Ralph Ellsworth Foster, Jr. (June 12, 1917 – June 3, 1999) was an American football tackle who played two seasons with the Chicago Cardinals of the National Football League (NFL). He was drafted by the Chicago Cardinals in the 17th round of the 1940 NFL Draft. He first enrolled at the University of Idaho before transferring to Oklahoma A&M College. Foster attended Perry High School in Perry, Oklahoma.

References

External links
Just Sports Stats

1917 births
1999 deaths
Players of American football from Oklahoma
American football tackles
Idaho Vandals football players
Oklahoma State Cowboys football players
Chicago Cardinals players
People from Perry, Oklahoma